The 2015 Bracknell Forest Borough Council election took place on 7 May 2015 to elect all 42 councillors in 18 wards for Bracknell Forest Borough Council in England.  The election took place alongside both the 2015 United Kingdom general election and other other local elections in England.  With the concurrent general election, turnout was significantly up on the last local election.  The Conservative Party was returned to a sixth term in office, continuing its hold on the council since its inception as a unitary authority in 1998.  The Labour Party was reduced to the single seat of its group leader in Great Hollands North - its worst result since 1987.

The local Conservative party had been rocked by a series of suspensions and defections during the last term.  After a revolt on the Conservative group over housing, Chas Bailey (Hanworth), Shelagh Pile (Harmans Water), and Michael Sargeant (Bullbrook) were suspended for four months.  Bailey initially returned to the Conservatives, but later elected to stand as a 'Hanworth & Birch Hill Residents' candidate after being de-selected.  Sargeant and Pile declined to rejoin, sitting first as independent conservatives, and then later joining the fledging UKIP.  Several other Conservative councillors were de-selected for the 2015 election, including former council leader Alan Ward (Central Sandhurst).  Will Davison (Hanworth) also joined UKIP after being de-selected.  Davison and Pile stood as UKIP candidates but both lost their seats, as did Bailey.  For a period, after the death of Alan Kendall in Winkfield & Cranbourne, the final council composition before the election was 35 Conservatives, 3 UKIP, and 2 Labour, and 1 Hanworth & Birch Hill Residents.

Summary

Ward Results
An asterisk (*) denotes an incumbent councillor standing for re-election

Ascot

Binfield with Warfield

Bullbrook

Central Sandhurst

College Town

Crown Wood

Crowthorne

Great Hollands North

Great Hollands South

Hanworth

Harmans Water

Little Sandhurst and Wellington

Old Bracknell

Owlsmoor

Priestwood and Garth

Warfield Harvest Ride

Wildridings & Central

Winkfield & Cranbourne

By-elections

Central Sandhurst

Footnotes

References

2010s in Berkshire
2015
2015 English local elections
May 2015 events in the United Kingdom